WUSM-FM (88.5 FM) is a radio station  broadcasting a AAA format. Licensed to Hattiesburg, Mississippi, United States, the station serves the Hattiesburg-Laurel area.  The station is currently owned by the University of Southern Mississippi.

WUSM offers a variety of public affairs programs and music that would otherwise not be available.  WUSM's diverse programming includes American Roots Music jazz, blues, Adult Album Alternative, alternative rock and local artists.

WUSM has embarked on a major awareness campaign in January 2011. Starting with a yearly golf tournament, A Round for Roots Radio, Roots Radio 88.5 spent 2011 engaging in a social media campaign to raise awareness and listenership in the community. WUSM hosted a series of concerts in conjunction with fall football games on the University of Southern Mississippi campus. Known as the WUSM Tailgate Concert Series, eight artists played tailgating events at the home games in 2011. Starting with Southbound Crescent on September 3, the free concerts were broadcast live on WUSM.

WUSM is also co-promoted a live concert with The Saenger Theatre and 206 Front with Leon Redbone on September 26. WUSM is also promoting a monthly series of live concerts in Hattiesburg featuring local, regional, and national acts that will be fund raising events for the radio station.

References

External links

USM-FM
USM
University of Southern Mississippi